The Mahmoodiah Royal Mausoleum is a Royal Mausoleum of Johor located at Bukit Mahmoodiah in Jalan Mahmoodiah, Johor Bahru, Malaysia. The first Sultan of Johor buried here was Sultan Abu Bakar in 1895. Besides that, the founder of UMNO, Dato' Onn Jaafar (died on 1962) was buried next to his father, Dato Jaafar bin Muhammad's grave (died in 1919).

Architecture 
The Mahmoodiah Royal Mausoleum was built in 1895. The mausoleum architecture is a combination of Victorian, Moorish and local Malay styles.

List of graves

Sultan graves

Sultan of Johor
 Sultan Sir Abu Bakar ibni Almarhum Temenggong Daeng Ibrahim Sri Maharaja Johor (died: 4 June 1895)
 Sultan Sir Ibrahim Al-Masyhur ibni Almarhum Sultan Sir Abu Bakar (died: 8 May 1959)
 Sultan Sir Ismail Al-Khalidi ibni Almarhum Sultan Sir Ibrahim Al-Masyhur (died: 10 May 1981)
 Sultan Iskandar Al-Mutawakkil Alallah ibni Almarhum Sultan Ismail Al-Khalidi – 8th Yang di-Pertuan Agong (1984–1989) (died: 22 January 2010)

Other Sultans grave
 Sultan Ismail Muabidin Riayat Shah ibni Almarhum Raja Thith Hitam (Marhum Mangkat di Skudai) – 25th Sultan of Perak (1871–1874) (died: unknown date) – exiled from Perak after the assassination of British Resident of Perak, JWW Birch in Pasir Salak on 2 November 1875.

Sultanah/Consort graves
 Sultanah Fatimah (died 1891)
 Tunku Maimunah binti Almarhum Ungku Abdul Majid (died 1909)
 Sultanah Rogayah (died 1926)
 Sultanah Aminah binti Almarhum Ungku Ahmad (died 1977)
 Enche' Besar Khalsom binti Abdullah (died 2018)
 Tunku Zanariah binti Almarhum Tengku Ahmad (died 2019)

Royal family graves

Johor Royal Family
 Ungku Abdul Majid bin Temenggong Tun Daeng Ibrahim (died 1889)
 Ungku Abdul Rahman bin Ungku Abdul Majid (died: unknown date)
 Ungku Abdullah bin Ungku Suleiman (died: unknown date)
 Ungku Ali bin Ungku Ahmad (died: unknown date)
 Ungku Haji Abdul Rahman bin Ungku Abdul Majid – Naib Yang di-Pertua Majlis Ugama Islam Negeri Johor (died: unknown date)
 Ungku Hasanah binti Ungku Abdul Majid (died: unknown date)
 Ungku Ismail bin Ungku Abdul Rahman (died: unknown date)
 Tunku Abdul Rahman ibni Almarhum Sultan Ismail – Tunku Aris Bendahara Johor (died: 12 July 1989)
 Ungku Esah binti Ungku Abdul Majid (died: 7 September 2014)
 Tunku Maimunah binti Almarhum Sultan Ismail (died: 11 July 2012)
 Tunku Tan Sri Dato' Osman bin Almarhum Tunku Temenggong Ahmad – Jumaah Majlis DiRaja Johor (Johor Royal Court Council) President (died: 6 July 2014)
 Tunku Miriam Sultan Ibrahim – daughter of Sultan Ibrahim al-Masyhur (died 2014)
 Tunku Abdul Jalil ibni Sultan Ibrahim – Tunku Laksamana Johor (died: 5 December 2015)
 Ungku Yusoff bin Ungku Abdul Rahman – Jumaah Majlis Diraja Johor (Johor Royal Court Council) Advisor (died: 29 July 2020)

Other royal family graves
 Raja Mahadi bin Raja Sulaiman (Selangor) – Chieftain of Klang, Selangor during Klang War (1849–1850) (died: unknown date) – exiled from Selangor after defeat in the war on 1850.

Leaders graves

Dato' Menteri Besar of Johor
 Dato' Jaafar Haji Muhammad – First Menteri Besar (died 1919)
 Dato' Onn Jaafar – UMNO first president (died 1962)
 Tan Sri Hassan Yunus – First elected Menteri Besar (died 1968)
 Tan Sri Othman Saat – Eleventh Menteri Besar (died 2007)

Other leaders
 Dato' Muhammad Salleh Perang – Dato' Bentara Luar (Architect of Development Johor) (died 1915)
 Dato' Suleiman Abdul Rahman – First Minister of the Interior (died 1963)
 Dato' Abdul Rahman Yassin – First President of the Dewan Negara (died 1970)
 Tan Sri Abdul Hamid Jumat – 1st Deputy Chief Minister of Singapore (died 1978)
 Tun Dr. Awang Hassan – 5th Governor of Penang (died 1998)

Non-leaders grave
 Dato' Sayyid Alwi Thahir al-Haddad – Former Mufti of Johor (died 1962)
 Tan Sri Zainon Munshi Sulaiman (Ibu Zain) – Malayan woman political, nationalist and educational (died 1989)
 Tan Sri Anwar Abdul Malik – Malayan political figure (died 1998)

See also
 Sultan of Johor

References

1895 establishments in British Malaya
Buildings and structures in Johor Bahru
Mausoleums in Johor